Let's Skip to the Wedding is the third studio album by Filipino singer-songwriter Eyedress, released on August 7, 2020, through Lex Records. The album was produced by Eyedress.

Reception

The Fader wrote that "the latest album from cult Filipino lo-fi artist and King Krule associate Eyedress is effortlessly cool..." with "...reverbed vocals and jangly guitars" and the "...searing dreampop levels up on his new record Let's Skip To The Wedding, particularly on the lush, head-spinning 'X-Girl.'". DIY highlighted "sunshine-soaked indie number, the self-produced ‘Can I See You Tonight?’ [which] oozes chilled vibes." PopMatters wrote "Faster cuts like 'Let's Skip to the Wedding', 'Jealous', and non-single standout 'Happy Hour' squeeze all possible sonic elements together in dense melodic ostinati over simple, driving rhythms". AllMusic described the album as "... a strange yet sweet web of homespun styles, sounding like a lost post-punk tape one minute (the goth-tinged "Last Time I'm Falling in Love") and a Prince demo the next (the wild falsetto vocals of "Never Been to Prom")."

Two singles from the album, "Jealous" and "Romantic Lover" became viral hits on TikTok. "Jealous" featured in over one million TikTok videos and appeared in The Fader's Best Songs of 2020 list.

"Jealous" was certified Gold in Australia, Canada, Poland and the USA 2021. In March 2023, the RIAA certified "Jealous" 2x Platinum and "Romantic Lover" Platinum.

Track listing

Charts

References 

2020 albums